Mandrake the Magician was an American radio show, broadcast on the Mutual Broadcasting System from November 11, 1940 until February 6, 1942. It was based on the popular comic strip Mandrake the Magician by Lee Falk and Phil Davis.

History

"Mandrake the Magician" was originally a three-day-a-week radio serial broadcast on the New York City radio station WOR (AM). Each episode was 15 minutes long. It expanded to five days a week in 1941. The serial was recorded at the radio studio in New York. 195 episodes were recorded. The direction was in hands of Carlo De Angelo, while Henry Souvaine acted as producer.

The serial aimed at a young audience. Just like the comic strip it invoked mystery, adventure and suspense. Every episode opened with Mandrake invoking his chant "Invoco legem magicarum" ("I invoke the laws of magic").

Cast
 Mandrake the Magician: Raymond Edward Johnson
 Lothar: Juano Hernandez
 Princess Narda: Jessica Tandy, Francesca Lenni

Sources

American radio dramas
American children's radio programs
1940 radio programme debuts
1942 radio programme endings
Radio programs based on comic strips
Mutual Broadcasting System programs